Aberaeron Amateur Football Club is a Welsh football team based in Aberaeron, Ceredigion, Wales.  The team currently play in the Central Wales League Southern Division, which is at the fourth tier of the Welsh football league system.

History
The club's website suggests the club was formed in the late 1800s. The club were a founder member of the Cardiganshire League and saw success as six times champions of the top league (four times in the 1950s) and nine times winners of the league's cup competition.

In 2010–11 they joined the newly created Mid Wales Football League Division Two.  The following season they were crowned champions and promoted to Division One for the 2012–13 season.

In July 2020 the club was announced as one of the tier 4 clubs in the restructured West Division of the Mid Wales Football League.

Honours
Ceredigion League Division One – winners (6): 1952–53; 1953–54; 1955–56; 1959–60; 1981–82; 2001–02
Ceredigion League Division Two – winners (3): 1992–93; 2003–04 (reserves); 2010–11 (reserves)
Ceredigion League Cup – winners (9): 1922–23; 1948–49; 1953–54; 1954–55; 1956–57; 1959–60; 1996–97; 2002–03; 2006–07
Mid Wales Football League Division Two – champions (1): 2011–12
Central Wales Challenge Cup – Winners: 2016–17

External links

References

Sport in Ceredigion
Mid Wales Football League clubs
Ceredigion League clubs
Football clubs in Wales